Jakkaphong Jakrajutatip  (born 17 February 1979), also known as Khun Anne Jakrajutatip, sometimes informally stylized as Anne JKN, is a Thai businesswoman and Chief Executive Officer of JKN Global Group. 

A notable media entrepreneur and digital content distributor in Thailand, Jakrajutatip is the current owner of the Miss Universe, Miss USA, and Miss Teen USA beauty pageant organizations. Jakrajutatip became the first trans-woman who fully owns these organizations in their history. According to Forbes, she is the third richest transgender person in the world, with an estimated net worth of US$210 million (6.37 billion baht) in 2020.

Early life

Jakkaphong Jakrajutatip was born in a Thai—Chinese family in Thailand. She is eldest child of Mr. Ashira Suthisataporn and Mrs. Ampai Jakrajutatip.  Her parents ran a video rental store and encouraged her to learn English. She speaks both English and Thai.

She has one younger sister, Pimuma “Dao” Jakrajutatip  and an estranged younger brother, Jatuphon “Joe” Suthisataporn. During her early years, she attended Assumption College (Thailand). She ran her family’s video distribution company for her parents and invested in many media licensing and real estate. 

She later attended university studies in Queensland, Australia and studied international relations at Bond University. She later earned a certificate of Real Estate Development from Chulalongkorn University and completed a Director Accreditation Program from the Thai Institute of Directors Association.

Career 
Jakrajutatip became Chief Executive Officer of JKN Global Group in 2018. She is also the founder and director of “Life Inspired for Transsexual Foundation”, a charity organization which advocates for transgender rights in Thailand. 

She is also a television host on the Thai Project Runway. In October 2022, she purchased the Miss Universe, Miss USA, and Miss Teen USA beauty pageants for $20 million USD citing the desire to expand the cause of women empowerment among those who are disenfranchised by poverty and gender discrimination. She also presented a new diadem for Miss Universe winners by sponsorship with the Mouawad jewel company.

In 2019, Anne was the first Thai and the first transgender woman to receive the Asia Media Woman of the Year award at the Content Asia Summit in Singapore. She is part of the "Women of the year 2022" by The Bangkok Post.

Personal life
Jakrajutatip is a transgender woman. She has 2 children of American citizenship, a firstborn son named Andrew, and a daughter, Angelica, both via surrogacy. She currently lives in Bangkok, Thailand.

References

Living people
Jakkaphong Jakrajutatip
Jakkaphong Jakrajutatip
20th-century businesswomen
Jakkaphong Jakrajutatip
Bond University alumni
Jakkaphong Jakrajutatip
Jakkaphong Jakrajutatip
Transgender women
Jakkaphong Jakrajutatip
Year of birth missing (living people)
Jakkaphong Jakrajutatip
Jakkaphong Jakrajutatip